Weaving the Web: The Original Design and Ultimate Destiny of the World Wide Web by its inventor (1999) is a book written by Tim Berners-Lee describing how the World Wide Web was created and his role in it.

References

Port, Otis. "How the Net Was Born—and Where It's Headed". Books. Bloomberg Businessweek. (November 1, 1999)

External links
 Weaving the Web

1999 non-fiction books
Texts related to the history of the Internet